Swiss Mexicans are Mexican citizens of full or partial Swiss ancestry. Swiss Mexican communities are found in Mexico City, Morelos, Oaxaca, Chiapas, Puebla, Veracruz, Quintana Roo and Chihuahua. There are about 4,700 Mexicans of Swiss ancestry and they either work as teachers, artists, researchers, missionaries or philanthropists.

History
Among the first settlements of Swiss immigrants, stands out a Swiss colony in Apaxco, State of Mexico that was founded by the Riefhkol family. By 1921, they settled there due to the construction of a cement plant in the area.

The Swiss Club
The oldest Swiss institution in Mexico is the Swiss Club. It was first established in the 1940s on an area of 10,000 square meters in Colonia del Valle, a neighborhood with a comfortable economy located south of the capital, the center began to operate with more than 50% Swiss among its associates.

Education
Colegio Suizo de México, a Swiss international primary and secondary school in Mexico catering to Swiss families has campuses in Cuernavaca, Mexico City, and Querétaro City.

Demographics 
1990 - 566 People

2000 - 478 People

2010 - 422 People

See also

Mexico–Switzerland relations
White Mexicans

References

Swiss diaspora
Mexican people of Swiss descent
European Mexican